FAI World Grand Prix is a Grand Prix aerobatics series led by Fédération Aéronautique Internationale.

From 1990 to 1995, the competition was named as the Breitling Series.

List of events and results

See also
 Red Bull Air Race

References

External links 
 Official site of FAI World Grand Prix
 Official site of Haute Voltige, organisators of FAI World Grand Prix

Aviation competitions and awards
Aerobatic competitions